Emerson Esnal Hernández (born January 29, 1989 in San Salvador, El Salvador) is a Salvadoran race walker. He began racing after a team of sports recruiters selected his best friend to try out, Hernández accompanied his friend, and one of the coaches at the try out noticed him. He represented El Salvador in the 50 km racewalk at the 2012 Summer Olympics in London.

Biography
Emerson Esnal Hernández was born in San Salvador, El Salvador on January 29, 1989, one of seven children of Juana Dolores Hernández. Hernández became involved with the sport of race walking when a group from the National Sports Institute of El Salvador visited his school looking for recruits. The team recruited Hernández's best friend Rafael Avalos, and Hernández accompanied him because Rafael was shy. They were taken to a stadium, where Hernández was noticed by a coach and entered training in athletics.

At age 13 Hernández began to train with coach Rafael Cerna, and only five months after beginning training Hernández won first place in a cross country race. By 2003 he had qualified for the World Junior Championships and in 2005 won a gold medal in the El Salvador National Championships. In the 2007 Pan American Race Walking Cup, he took 4th place in the Junior Men's 10 km Racewalk. During the early years of his athletic career, he continued his academic studies and in 2008 he graduated with a B.A. in psychology from the Instituto Nacional Alberto Masferrer de la Zacamil. At the 2008 World Youth Athletics Championship, Hernández and his coach were involved in a controversy when the runners in Hernández' race were provided with carbonated water rather than uncarbonated water. Hernández and his coach claimed that this led to nausea, stomach cramps, and dizziness, and led to his withdrawal from the race.

He qualified for the 2010 Central American Games in Puerto Rico, but withdrew due to injury, and in the same year finished 24th in the 50 km racewalk at the World Cup in Chihuahua, Mexico. As of 2012, he was ranked 54th in the world in the 50 km runwalk. During the 2011 Pan American Games in Guadalajara, Mexico, he finished in 6th place, eight minutes behind the 5th-place finisher.  Hernández qualified to represent El Salvador in the 2012 Olympic Games in London in the 50 km racewalk, and traveled to Italy prior to the games for training. There, he has been coached by experienced Italian racewalking coach Sandro Damilano, who has trained a number of Chinese and Italian athletes for the Olympics. As of 2012, he was ranked 50th in the world in the 50 km event, and was the highest ranking Salvadoran racewalker.  At the 2012 Olympics, he finished in 26th place with a new personal best time of 3:53:57.

Personal bests

Track walk
10,000 m: 42:17.56 min –  Philadelphia, Pennsylvania, 26 April 2014

Road walk
10 km: 43:10 min –  San Salvador, 3 February 2007
20 km: 1:26:34 hrs –  Sesto San Giovanni, 1 May 2013
50 km: 3:53:57 hrs –  London, 11 August 2012

Achievements

References

External links
 
 
 Tilastopaja biography

1989 births
Salvadoran male racewalkers
Athletes (track and field) at the 2011 Pan American Games
Athletes (track and field) at the 2012 Summer Olympics
Olympic athletes of El Salvador
Pan American Games competitors for El Salvador
Living people
World Athletics Championships athletes for El Salvador